The City Game is an annual college basketball game between the University of Pittsburgh Panthers and the Duquesne University Dukes. The term "City Game" is also used refer to women's basketball games played annually between the two universities and may also be used to refer to other athletic competitions between the two schools.

History

The basketball series was first played in 1932. The cross-town rivalry between the two schools intensified quickly, and the development of bad blood between the two schools on the basketball court and in the boxing ring led to the cessation of series following the 1939 game until it was renewed in 1953. The rivalry reached its peak when both schools again found themselves members of the same athletic conference, the Eastern 8 (originally named the Eastern Collegiate Basketball League in its first season of 1976–77, formally the Eastern Athletic Association, and renamed the Atlantic 10 Conference following the 1981–82 season), from 1976 to 1982. During this period, the head coaches of Pitt and Duquesne, Tim Grgurich and Mike Rice respectively, were alumni of their schools and had played against each other in the 1960s. There was genuine dislike between coaches and players, and during these contests fights frequently broke out between players, and sometimes among fans. The series of games between the schools during the years that both were members of the Eastern 8 was won by Pitt 9–7.  Duquesne and Pitt have met once in post-season play, not including two Eastern 8 Tournament games, which resulted in a 65–63 Duquesne victory over the Panthers in the first round of the 1980 NIT at the Civic Arena.

However,  the competitiveness of the series has waned since Pitt left for the Big East Conference beginning in the 1982–83 season as Pitt has now won 32 of the last 35 games. The men's basketball series is currently on hiatus, having last been played in 2018. It is unknown when the series will resume, as there have been disputes about the scheduling terms, including the venue.

Location
The location of the City Game has varied between both on-campus and off-campus venues for both schools and throughout their history, they have also shared venues to use as their home floor.  Both Pittsburgh and Duquesne used the Pitt Pavilion, located inside of Pitt Stadium, for their home games until January 28, 1939 when Pitt's director of athletics Jimmy Hagan announced a cessation of basketball relations with Duquesne following the development of bad blood between the schools on the court. The series returned in 1953 at Pitt's home floor, Fitzgerald Field House, that had opened in 1951.  This facility on the campus of the University of Pittsburgh would serve as the home floor of the Panthers through the opening of the Petersen Events Center in 2002, although Pitt played select home games at the Pittsburgh Civic Arena in the 1980s and 1990s. Duquesne also used Fitzgerald Field House as its home floor following the demolition of its home court, Duquesne Gardens, in 1956. Duquesne began playing games in the Civic Arena as early as December 1961 and subsequently switched to using the Civic Arena as its primary home floor between 1964 and 1988.  Duquesne moved into a new on-campus home at the A. J. Palumbo Center beginning in the 1988–89 season.  From 1990 to 2001, the series was back to being played at the Civic Arena/Mellon Arena. The series then rotated on a yearly basis between the on-campus venues of the Petersen Events Center and the A. J. Palumbo Center.

In 2009, the game returned to Mellon Arena and was the last basketball game played at that venue (not counting a Harlem Globetrotters game on December 26, 2009).  Pitt rallied from trailing by 16 to winning 67–58 in double overtime.  It was the first multiple overtime game in the series' history.

Upon the opening of the PPG Paints Arena in 2010, the game will be held annually at that site. Each team has an exclusive locker room in the new facility.

Men's game results

Where there are discrepancies between game scores, the score provided in the table is the one provided by sources from the winning team.
* This game is listed as a Duquesne victory with a score of 31–30 in the Pitt media guide.
# This game is listed as a Duquesne victory with a score of 75–46 in the Pitt media guide.
^This game is listed as a Pittsburgh victory with a score of 84–74 in the Duquesne media guide.

Women's basketball
The women's basketball City Game series dates to 1974 when the University of Pittsburgh resurrected its women's varsity athletic program. The Pitt women's 91–32 win against Duquesne in the 1974 Pitt Tournament marked its first game and victory of the modern era since the program had been on hiatus at the close of the 1926–1927 season.  Including the 1974 win, Pitt dominated the early series winning the first 13 games.  The game has sometimes been played as a double header with the men's game and has been played three times at the Civic Arena in 1995, 1996, and 1998.  Pitt leads the series 22–17 and was the winner of four straight prior to the Dukes winning four in a row since 2009.

Baseball
The baseball contest between the University of Pittsburgh and Duquesne University was often referred to as the baseball version of the City Game and was sometimes played at special venues including Major League Baseball's PNC Park. The first collegiate baseball game at PNC Park was played on May 6, 2003, between Pittsburgh and Duquesne. Duquesne won the game by a score of 2–1.  Following the 2010 season, Duquesne discontinued its varsity baseball program, bringing the City Game baseball series to an end. The PNC Park City Game series ended in Pitt's favor, four games to two, with the 2007 game canceled because of poor field conditions. The final City Game baseball series was split with Pitt winning an April 14, 2010 game at Trees Field 21–9, and Duquesne, oddly serving as the home team at Pitt's Trees Field, winning the final meeting, 10–9, on May 12, 2010. The all-time series between the schools ended in Pitt's favor, 58–22–1.

Men's soccer

Football

See also

College rivalry

References

Pittsburgh Panthers basketball
Duquesne Dukes men's basketball
College basketball rivalries in the United States